The Supreme Court of the United States is the highest ranking judicial body in the United States. Established by Article III of the Constitution, the Court was organized by the 1st United States Congress through the Judiciary Act of 1789, which specified its original and appellate jurisdiction, created 13 judicial districts, and fixed the size of the Supreme Court at six, with one chief justice and five associate justices. During the 19th century, Congress changed the size of the Court on seven occasions, concluding with the Judiciary Act of 1869 which stipulates that the Court consists of the chief justice and eight associate justices.

Article II, Section 2, Clause 2 of the Constitution grants plenary power to the president of the United States to nominate, and with the advice and consent (confirmation) of the United States Senate, appoint justices to the Supreme Court. Nominations to the Supreme Court are considered to be official when the Senate receives a signed nomination letter from the president naming the nominee, which is then entered in the Senate's record. Since 1789, there have been 165 formal nominations (of 146 persons) to the Supreme Court; 128 of them (123 persons) have been confirmed. The most recent nomination to be confirmed was that of Ketanji Brown Jackson in 2022. Of the 37 that were unsuccessful, 11 nominees were rejected in Senate roll-call votes, 12 were withdrawn by the president, and 14 lapsed at the end of a session of Congress. Six of these unsuccessful nominees were subsequently nominated and confirmed to other seats on the Court. Additionally, although confirmed, seven nominees either declined office or (in one instance) died before assuming office.

An important role in this process is played by the Senate Judiciary Committee, which conducts a comprehensive evaluation of a nominee's background and qualifications before the Senate considers the nomination. Once confirmed to a seat on the Court, justices have life tenure, and so they serve until they die in office, resign or retire, or are impeached and removed from office. Even so, as it requires a separate presidential appointment, an incumbent associate justice who is nominated to be chief justice must undergo the confirmation process again.

On rare occasions, presidents have made Supreme Court appointments without the Senate's consent, when the Senate is in recess. Such "recess appointments", however, are temporary, expiring at the end of the Senate's next session. Presidents have made recess appointments on 12 occasions, most recently in 1958. Every recess appointed justice was later nominated to the same position, and all but one—John Rutledge in 1795 to be chief justice—was confirmed by the Senate. The 1795 Rutledge nomination was the first Supreme Court nomination to be rejected by the Senate; the most recent nomination to be voted down was that of Robert Bork in 1987. George Washington holds the record for most Supreme Court nominations, with 14 nominations (12 of which were confirmed). Four presidents—William Henry Harrison, Zachary Taylor, Andrew Johnson, and Jimmy Carter—did not make any nominations, as there were no vacancies while they were in office.

Summary of table

The table below lists all persons nominated for a seat on the Supreme Court since 1789, in chronological order by date of nomination, along with the actions taken by the president and the Senate on those nominations. Specifically, the table lists the following for each Supreme Court nomination:
 name of each nominee;
 name of the president who made the nomination, and their political party affiliation;
 name of the justice whose departure created the vacancy (the column sorts so as to show the person-to-person succession of judges since 1789);
 majority party in the Senate at the time of the nomination;
 date on which the president formally made the nomination, by signing a nomination message;
 outcome, the type and date of final action by the Senate, or of a nomination's withdrawal by the president;
 number of days that elapsed from the date a nomination was formally submitted until the date of final Senate action or the nomination's withdrawal.

The following final results of the nomination process are tracked:
 confirmednominations confirmed by the Senate (including those of persons who subsequently declined to serve, or who died before taking office);
 withdrawnnominations withdrawn by the president prior to a confirmation vote;
 rejectednominations rejected by the Senate;
 lapsednominations that lapsed at the end of a session of Congress without a Senate vote cast on whether to confirm (including nominations that were postponed or tabled by the Senate that were not given further consideration).
Additionally, where the final Senate action on a nomination was a roll-call vote (as opposed to a voice vote or unanimous consent), the totals for and against are noted.

In listing all persons ever nominated to the Supreme Court, the table includes the names of those who were not confirmed as well as those who were confirmed but did not assume office. For a list solely of the 115 individuals who assumed office and served on the Court, see List of justices of the Supreme Court of the United States. Not included in the table are intended nominees, announced presidential selections whose names were withdrawn prior to being formally submitted to the Senate, as such persons were never officially nominated to the Court.

Nominations

See also
Thurmond rule

Notes

References

External links
 Supreme Court Nominations Research Guide, Georgetown University Law Library
 Supreme Court of the United States
 U.S. Senate Judiciary Committee